Andrea Maida (born 23 March 1964 in Loreo, Rovigo Italy) is a former Italian motorcycle speedway rider who is a member of Italy's national team.

Early life
As a child prior to Speedway he started practicing skating achieving several wins in provincial and regional championships. Looking for more excitement, he devotes himself to karate gaining a brilliant third place in the Italian championship. The love for bikes without brakes begins back in 1973 when he was 9 years old and he has his first encounter with this particular motoring.

Career details 
 Team World Championship (Speedway World Team Cup and Speedway World Cup)
 1994 - 4th place in Group A
 1999 - 2nd place in Quarter-Final A
 2000 - 4th place in Semi-Final B
 2001 - 3rd place in Preliminary round 1
 2003 - 11th place
 2004 - 7th place
 2007 - 3rd place in Qualifying round 2
 2008 - 4th place in Qualifying round 2
 Individual European Championship
 2003 -  Slaný - 16th place (1 pt)
 European Pairs Championship
 200 - 6th place in Semi-Final 1
 2005 -  Gdańsk - 6th place (3 pts)
 2007 -  Terenzano - 7th place (10 pts)
 European Club Champions' Cup
 1999 - qualify to Group A
 2007 - 2nd place in Semi-Final 1

See also 
 Italy national speedway team

References

External links
 Official Website

Living people
Italian speedway riders
1964 births